This is a list of African-American newspapers that have been published in the state of Washington.  It includes both current and historical newspapers.  The first such newspaper in Washington was the Seattle Standard, established in 1890.  Notable current newspapers in Washington include The Facts and the Seattle Medium.

Newspapers
 The Facts (Seattle)
 Seattle Medium 
 Seattle Metro Homemaker
 Seattle Republican (defunct)
 The Tacoma True Citizen

See also 
List of African-American newspapers and media outlets
List of African-American newspapers in Alaska
List of African-American newspapers in Montana
List of African-American newspapers in Oregon
List of newspapers in Washington (state)

Works cited

References 

Newspapers
Washington
African-American
African-American newspapers